Alastair Scott may refer to:

Alastair Scott (cricketer) (born 1966), former English cricketer
Alastair Scott (politician) (born 1965), New Zealand member of the House of Representatives

See also
Alistair Scott (disambiguation)